Liane Foly (born 16 December 1962, in Lyon) is a popular French blues and jazz singer, actress, presenter and impressionist.

Early years
Foly was born 16 December 1962 in the 7th arrondissement of Lyon. Her parents, a merchant family in French Algeria, returned to France in 1962 with the Pied-Noir community and moved to Lyon, near the Perrache quarter, where they owned La droguerie du sourire. As a child of five she practised dancing. At age 12, she sang with her parents' orchestra Black and White with her brother Philippe on the drums and her sister Corinne at the piano. Later she continued to sing in local night clubs and bars, developing an affinity for blues and jazz. She studied languages for her Baccalauréat and is bilingual in French and English.

Foly's brother is Philippe Falliex, a French composer for television and radio shows. He composed several of her songs and accompanied her on stage as a drummer.

Career
In 1984, Foly was discovered by Philippe Viennet and André Manoukian, who offered to write for her and record a demo. After much work she arrived in Paris in 1987 and obtained a meeting with Fabrice Nataf, artistic director and patron of Virgin France, who launched her career. She took on the name Liane Foly in 1986, Foly in homage to Dalí, who at the time said in an advertisement that he was mad for chocolate. In 1988, she published her first album, The Man I Love, promoted by the Ca va, ça vient single. It was a commercial success, landing in the top 50. The same year she performed on stage in Paris (La Cigale). The album was composed by André Manoukian, with lyrics written by Foly and Philippe Viennet. Her 1997 album, Caméléon, was Foly's first without André Manoukian. Produced by Philippe Viennet, it was largely ignored by the French public. She took a greater part in the composition of her 2000 album, Entre nous.

Discography

Albums
 1985 : Besoin de toi
 1988 : The Man I Love
 1990 : Rêve orange
 1993 : Les Petites Notes, also recorded in English as Sweet Mystery
 1996 : Lumières (live)
 1997 : Caméléon, recorded in Los Angeles
 1999 : Acoustique
 2000 : Entre nous
 2002 : Au fur et à mesure (best of)
 2004 : La chanteuse de bal
 2005 : Une étoile dort (recorded live at the Casino de Paris)
 2008 : Le goût du désir
 2016 :  Crooneuse

Singles 

 1985 : Besoin de toi 
 1988 : Ca va, ca vient
 1988 : Love me, love moi
 1989 : Chéri
 1990 : Au fur et à mesure
 1991 : Goodbye Lover
 1991 : Rêve Orange
 1991 : Va savoir
 1991 : S'en balancer
 1991 : Les feuilles mortes
 1992 : La belle et la bête (Ft Charles Aznavour)
 1993 : Doucement
 1993 : Laisse pleurer les nuages
 1994 : J'irai tranquille
 1994 : A trace of you
 1994 : Sweet mystery
 1994 : Les yeux doux
 1994 : Voler la nuit
 1994 : Jalna
 1994 : Heures hindoues
 1994 : La grande parade des animaux
 1994 : J'ai le cœur en bois (Ft Yves Duteil)
 1997 : C'est bon d'aimer
 1997 : De l'autre côté du temps
 1997 : L'amour est fort
 1998 : Victoire
 1999 : La vie ne m'apprend rien
 1999 : Aime-moi
 2000 : Il est mort le soleil
 2000 : La chanson de Léa
 2001 : On a tous le droit
 2001 : Être vrai
 2002 : Une place sur terre
 2002 : Vivre
 2004 : La chanteuse de bal
 2005 : Déracinée
 2005 : Une étoile dort
 2008 : Reviens-moi
 2008 : Ma vie sans toi
 2011 : Colette
 2016 : J'aime regarder les filles
 2016 : C'est extra
 2016 : La Boîte de Jazz
 2016 : Voilà c'est fini

Soundtracks
 1992 : Beauty and the Beast, La Belle et La Bête (Ft Charles Aznavour)
 1994 : Jalna (TV Series), generic
 1995 : Sabrina, Les Petites Notes
 2000 : La Bicyclette bleue (TV Movie), La Chanson de Léa
 2010 : What War May Bring, Du chaud dans tes bras, Que reste-t-il de nos amours, Cette fille-là & B comme Berlin

Filmography

Dubbing

Theater

Television

Radio

Other work
 Since 1993, she is a member of Les Enfoirés, a union of artists who sing every year at a charity concert for the association the Restaurants du Cœur.
 Since 1995, part of proceeds from her two albums went to AIDS charities. 
 Since 2006, she has worked for AFIPA, an organization fighting the commercialisation of pet animal furs (dogs and cats). 
 In 2007, she is the godmother of the TV Show "Téléthon" and the non-profit organisation Make a Wish (Belgium).
 In 2013, she is the godmother of the France women's national football team.

References

External links
 Official website

French women singers
1962 births
Living people
Musicians from Lyon
Musicians from Paris
French expatriates in England
English-language singers from France
French blues singers
French jazz singers
Virgin Records artists
French women jazz singers
French impressionists (entertainers)
Audiobook narrators